Middletown Springs is a town in Rutland County, Vermont, United States.  The population was 794 at the 2020 census.

Geography
According to the United States Census Bureau, the town has a total area of 22.9 square miles (59.2 km2), all land. The unincorporated village of Middletown Springs is at the center of the town.

History
Middletown Springs "was officially founded in 1784 when citizens of the towns of Ira, Poultney, Wells, and Tinmouth petitioned the Vermont legislature to create a new town bounded by the ridges that prevented them from attending meetings and worship services in their original towns."

Demographics

As of the census of 2000, there were 823 people, 331 households, and 237 families residing in the town.  The population density was 36.0 people per square mile (13.9/km2).  There were 397 housing units at an average density of 17.4 per square mile (6.7/km2).  The racial makeup of the town was 97.81% White, 0.49% African American, 0.49% Native American, 0.36% Asian, 0.24% from other races, and 0.61% from two or more races. Hispanic or Latino of any race were 0.49% of the population.

There were 331 households, out of which 31.4% had children under the age of 18 living with them, 61.0% were married couples living together, 7.9% had a female householder with no husband present, and 28.1% were non-families. 22.7% of all households were made up of individuals, and 8.8% had someone living alone who was 65 years of age or older.  The average household size was 2.49 and the average family size was 2.92.

In the town, the population was spread out, with 24.9% under the age of 18, 5.3% from 18 to 24, 28.3% from 25 to 44, 29.2% from 45 to 64, and 12.3% who were 65 years of age or older.  The median age was 41 years. For every 100 females, there were 91.8 males.  For every 100 females age 18 and over, there were 91.9 males.

The median income for a household in the town was $35,385, and the median income for a family was $43,750. Males had a median income of $33,214 versus $25,114 for females. The per capita income for the town was $18,914.  About 10.0% of families and 11.8% of the population were below the poverty line, including 19.0% of those under age 18 and 2.0% of those age 65 or over.

Notable people 

 Frank Asch (born 1946), children's book writer
 Walter W. Granger (1872–1941), noted paleontologist

References

 
Towns in Vermont
Towns in Rutland County, Vermont